Elphinstone College Ground or Oval Ground is a multi purpose ground in Mumbai, Maharashtra. The ground is mainly used for organizing matches of football, cricket and other sports. It is one of the oldest cricket grounds in Mumbai, and located  near Elphinstone College. The ground is mainly used for Mumbai's prestigious Dr HD Kanga Memorial Cricket League. The ground hosted its first match in  when Elphinstone College Past and Present played against Ceylonese on their tour to India.

References

External links
 Cricketarchive
 
 Early photograph, in the British Library collection, of Elphinstone College

Sports venues in Mumbai
Cricket grounds in Maharashtra
Sport in Mumbai
Sports venues completed in 1902
1902 establishments in India
Cricket in Mumbai
20th-century architecture in India